The EuroCup Basketball Rising Star is an annual award of EuroCup Basketball, which is the secondary level European-wide professional club basketball league, that is given to the player that EuroCup Basketball deems its "top rising star". The EuroCup Basketball League is the European-wide professional basketball league that is one tier level below the top-tier EuroLeague. The award began in the EuroCup Basketball 2008–09 season.

Only players who were younger than age 22, on July 1 of the summer before the season started, are eligible for the award.

Winners

 There was no awarding in the 2019–20, because the season was cancelled due to the coronavirus pandemic in Europe.

See also
EuroLeague Rising Star

References

External links
EuroCup Basketball Official Web Page

Awards
European basketball awards